Claro Que Si is Yello's second album, released in 1981. "Claro que si" is Spanish for "Yes of course" and was reissued in 2005 in part of Yello Remaster Series with rare bonus tracks.

Track listing

Personnel
 Yello
 Boris Blank – electronics, backing vocals
 Dieter Meier – vocals
 Carlos Perón – tapes

 Additional personnel
 Beat Ash – drums
 Chico Hablas – guitars
 Zine el Abedine – vocals on "Ouad el Habib"

Cover Design / Illustration
 Jim Cherry

References

1981 albums
Mercury Records albums
Ralph Records albums
Vertigo Records albums
Yello albums